Malaysia External Trade Development Corporation (officially abbreviated as MATRADE) is a Malaysian external trade government agency. Its key role is to assist Malaysian exporters to develop and expand their export markets. The agency was established under the MATRADE Act 1992 in March 1993 as a statutory agency and external trade promotion arm under the Ministry of International Trade and Industry Malaysia (MITI).

MATRADE is also the owner and operator of the MATRADE Exhibition and Convention Centre (MECC) which was opened in January 2007. Tan Sri Dr. Halim Mohammad is a current Chairman of MATRADE effective 1 January 2019.

Overview
MATRADE is under the administration of the Ministry of International Trade and Industry of Malaysia and established in March 1993 under the MATRADE Act 1992 and responsible to promote and execute trade initiatives in Malaysia and helping Malaysian companies and enterprises to achieve success in the international market.

Vision and mission
 Positioning Malaysia As A Globally Competitive Trading Nation
 Promoting Malaysia's Enterprises To The World

References

External links
 

Federal ministries, departments and agencies of Malaysia
1993 establishments in Malaysia
Ministry of International Trade and Industry (Malaysia)
Government agencies established in 1993